Kaadhal 2014 is a 2014 Indian Tamil-language romantic drama film directed by Suganthan and starring Harish, Neha, and Manikandan. The film is about female empowerment. Boys Manikandan debuted as a villain with this film.

Cast  
Harish as Baskaran
Neha as Ranjani 
Manikandan as Kumar
Appukutty
Pasanga Sivakumar
Velmurugan
 Kambam Meena
 Sharmila
 Alagappan
 S R Pandiyan as Kittu
 Shivani 
 Salem Chinna Karuppu

Release 
Malini Mannath of The New Indian Express opined that "Dealing with a crucial issue, what was needed was a more focused screenplay and mature handling". A critic from Maalaimalar praised the film's novelty and music. A critic from iFlicks praised the film's theme and music while criticised the film's pace. A critic from Dinamalar called the film old-fashioned.

References

2014 films
2014 romantic drama films
Indian romantic drama films
2010s Tamil-language films